Otepää Parish is a rural municipality in Valga County, southern Estonia. It includes the town of Otepää.

Settlements
Town
Otepää

Small boroughs
Puka - Sangaste

Villages
Ädu - Arula- Ilmjärve - Kääriku - Kähri - Kassiratta - Kastolatsi - Kaurutootsi - Keeni - Kibena - Koigu - Kolli - Komsi - Kuigatsi - Kurevere - Lauküla - Lossiküla - Lutike - Mäeküla - Mägestiku - Mägiste - Mäha - Märdi - Makita - Meegaste - Miti - Neeruti - Nõuni - Nüpli - Otepää küla - Pedajamäe - Päidla - Pilkuse - Plika - Põru - Prange - Pringi - Pühajärve - Räbi - Raudsepa - Restu - Risttee - Ruuna - Sarapuu - Sihva - Tiidu - Tõutsi -Truuta - Vaalu - Vaardi - Vana-Otepää - Vidrike

Religion

See also
Tehvandi Sports Center

References

External links